Two ships in the United States Navy have been named USS Thornton for James Thornton.

 The first  was a torpedo boat, commissioned in 1902, decommissioned and redesignated Coastal Torpedo Vessel No. 16 in 1918.

United States Navy ship names